The Yale Dramatic Association, also known as the "Yale Dramat," is the third oldest college theater company in the United States. Founded in 1901 by undergraduates at Yale University, the Dramat has been producing student theatre in the United States for over a century.

Background 
Though no formal theatre company existed at Yale during its first two centuries of existence, dramas and comedies were enjoyed by students from the earliest days. When Professor William Lyon Phelps, '87, commenced his teaching during the 1890s, he began a literary Renaissance that culminated in his sponsorship of the Dramatic Association, founded by Henry D. Wescott, Class of 1901, as a club for students interested in public performances of plays. The first meeting of the organization, chaired by Wescott, occurred on February 2, 1900.

History 
As archivist Gerasimos Tsourapas described its first days:

Cole Porter was undoubtedly the best-known of the Dramat's early Twentieth-Century figures. Not only did he perform both male and female roles, but he wrote and directed three "smoker" productions and composed the totemic song "The Queen of the Yale Dramat" (1911) satirizing drag roles. His first show, And Still the Villain Pursued Her, poked fun at melodramas, while the second, Kaleidoscope, was a send-up of college life.

Since Porter's days the Dramat has fostered the careers of many distinguished actors, for example in the World Premiere production of Arthur Miller's The Crucible in 1957, (in two acts) prior to Broadway. In 1960 Sam Waterston and Austin Pendleton starred in Waiting for Godot. The Dramat was the first company to perform Thornton Wilder's one act play, The Long Christmas Dinner.

During the 1970s the company expanded its range and sophistication, with daring productions such as The Frogs, a musical adaptation of the Aristophanes comedy by Stephen Sondheim and Burt Shevelove, staged in the pool of Payne Whitney Gymnasium. Ted Tally, a future Academy Award winning screenwriter for Silence of the Lambs starred opposite Alley Mills of television's The Wonder Years. While Meryl Streep trod the boards at the Drama School, Mark Linn-Baker and Robert Picardo delighted audiences on the Dramat stage.

The 1980s saw additional steps forward, with original works by undergraduates such as Tina Landau, class of 1984. Her In the Image of Kings was a provocative treatment of lunatic monarchs. Since then the Dramat has maintained its high standards with both classics and modern masterpieces, musicals, reviews, light operas, and the occasional spoof in the tradition of Porter.

Administration 
The Dramat is run by a ten undergraduate member executive board which oversees the daily business of the Dramat, which includes selecting repertoire for performance and choosing or hiring directors for its productions. The Dramat's membership includes around 100 Yale undergraduates as well as many honorary and life-time members.

The Dramat played a large part in the founding of the Yale School of Drama and the construction of its main facility, the University Theater (also known as the UT).

Notable alumni
Stewart Alsop, writer and newspaper columnist
Peter Bergman: comedian, playwright, founder of The Firesign Theatre
Dick Cavett, television personality, comedian, and talk show host
John Conklin, scenic and costume designer
Bradford Dillman, actor and author
Jodie Foster, actress
Paul Giamatti, actor
Mark Alan Hewitt, architect and author
August Heckscher II, author and intellectual
George Roy Hill, film director
Bill Hinnant, actor
Skip Hinnant, actor and comedian; Bill's younger brother
Peter H. Hunt, director, lighting designer
Lewis A. Lapham, journalist and shipping executive
Mark Linn-Baker, actor
Ron Livingston, actor
Richard Maltby, Jr., Tony Award-winning director and lyricist
Jefferson Mays, Tony Award-winning actor
Edward Norton, actor
Claes Oldenburg, sculptor
Austin Pendleton, actor, playwright, and director
Robert Picardo, actor
Bronson Pinchot, actor
Cole Porter, composer of musicals
Philip Proctor: actor, member of The Firesign Theatre
Rex Robbins, actor
Sidney Dillon Ripley, secretary of Smithsonian Institution
David Shire, songwriter and composer (often in collaboration with Richard Maltby as lyricist)
Ted Tally, screenwriter and playwright
Alex Timbers, director
Sonny Tufts, actor
Stephen Vincent Benét, writer
Thornton Wilder, writer
Sam Waterston, actor
James Whitmore, actor
Monty Woolley, director and actor

References

External links

Culture of Yale University
Arts organizations established in 1901
Theatre companies in Connecticut
1901 establishments in Connecticut